Mikawe may refer to:

 , a United States Navy patrol vessel in commission from 1917 to 1919
 , a United States Coast and Geodetic Survey launch in commission from 1920 to 1939

Mikawe